Băneasa railway station is a railway station in Băneasa borough of Bucharest, Romania, in the northern part of the city. It is situated on the main line to the Black Sea coast.

The railway station was inaugurated on 17 November 1886, under the name Gara Mogoșoaia.  Traditionally, the railway station is used for the Royal departures and arrivals in the Royal Train; recently, on 16 December 2017, this was the departure point for King Michael I's funeral train to the Royal necropolis in Curtea de Argeș.

External links
Photo gallery of Băneasa railway station

Railway stations in Bucharest
1886 establishments in Romania
Railway stations opened in 1886
Rail
19th-century architecture in Romania